Luis Doldán (19 January 1938 – 4 July 2015) was a Paraguayan footballer. He played in one match for the Paraguay national football team in 1968. He was also part of Paraguay's squad for the 1959 South American Championship that took place in Argentina.

References

External links
 

1938 births
2015 deaths
Paraguayan footballers
Paraguay international footballers
Place of birth missing
Association football forwards
Club Olimpia footballers
CD Puertollano footballers
Paraguayan expatriate footballers
Expatriate footballers in Spain